Livin' the Luxury Brown is the fifth studio album by American R&B group Mint Condition. The album was released on April 26, 2005 on Image Entertainment. Livin' the Luxury Brown is the first album released as a quintet, after the departure of the band's keyboardist Keri Lewis.

The album charted at No. 45 on the Billboard 200, No. 11 on the Top R&B Albums chart and No. 1 on the Top Independent Albums chart, becoming the group's successful independent album. Two singles were released, "Whoaa" and "I'm Ready", the latter reaching No. 49 on the Billboard Top R&B/Hip-Hop Singles & Tracks chart.

Track listing

2005 albums
Mint Condition (band) albums
Image Entertainment albums